The Battle of Monroe's Crossroads (also known as the Battle of Fayetteville Road, and colloquially in the North as Kilpatrick's Shirttail Skedaddle) was a battle during the Carolinas Campaign of the American Civil War in Cumberland County, North Carolina (now in Hoke County), on the grounds of the present day Fort Bragg Military Reservation. Involving about 4,500 men, it pitted mounted Confederate cavalry against dismounted Union cavalry. It was one of the last all-cavalry battles of the Civil War. The inconclusive fighting lasted for several hours early on the morning of March 10, 1865. The Confederate attack delayed the Federal cavalry's movement toward Fayetteville, denying Brevet Maj. Gen. Hugh Judson Kilpatrick the honor of entering the town first.

Battle

The main Confederate assault was at dawn and against a poorly guarded and sleeping Union camp. In command of the Confederate forces were Lt. Gen. Wade Hampton and Maj. Gen. Joseph Wheeler, who were operating together for the first time. One of the goals (not fulfilled) was the capture of Kilpatrick himself, using a small elite squadron of hand-picked troopers. Kilpatrick, ensconced with his mistress in a small log cabin near the farmhouse of Charles Monroe, managed to flee the chaotic scene in his nightshirt, hiding for a period in a nearby swamp before regaining his composure and reorganizing his troops. While initially routed, the Federal cavalry soon recovered and counterattacked, eventually pressuring the Confederates to withdraw from the camp. Anticipating the approach of Union infantry, the Confederate commanders ordered their troops to disengage from the action in the mid-morning. Hampton's cavalry finally withdrew in good order toward Fayetteville. Confederate Brig. Gen. Thomas Harrison, Brig. Gen. William Y.C. Humes, Col. and brigade commander James Hagan and Col. and brigade commander Moses W. Hannon were wounded during the battle. Brig. Gen. William W. Allen and Colonel and brigade commander Henry Marshall Ashby were injured when their horses were shot from under them.

Aftermath
The Battle of Monroe's Crossroads gained the additional time needed for the Confederate infantry to conduct an organized crossing of the Cape Fear River at Fayetteville unmolested by the advancing Federals. With their troops and equipment east of the Cape Fear, the Confederates burned the bridges as Union forces entered the city.

The graves of several unidentified Union soldiers can still be seen today in the training area of Ft. Bragg a few miles south of the Normandy Dropzone near the Coleman Impact Area. All visits must be approved by range control.

Notes

References
 Eicher, John H., and David J. Eicher, Civil War High Commands. Stanford: Stanford University Press, 2001. .
 Longacre, Edward G. A Soldier to the Last: Maj. Gen. Joseph Wheeler in Blue and Gray. Washington, DC: Potomac Books, 2007. .
 National Park Service battle study
 NPS CWSAC battle summary
 CWSAC Report Update
 North Carolina History Project

1865 in the American Civil War
1865 in North Carolina
Monroe's Crossroads
Monroe's Crossroads
Monroe's Crossroads
Hoke County, North Carolina
Monroe's Crossroads
March 1865 events